Zanthoxylum macranthum (Chinese: 大花花椒), is a species of woody plants in the family Rutaceae. It is native to the upland open forests and thickets in south-east Tibet and southern China, and has been found in Chongqing (Nanchuan), Guizhou, south-west Henan, western Hubei, Hunan, Sichuan (Emei Shan), southern Yunnan (Xishuangbanna), and south-east Xizang.

Characteristics 
Climbing vine; branchlets are dark gray, with fine longitudinal wrinkles, spines are usually only found on the back of leaf shafts, or without spines. The leaf has 3-7 leaflets, nine rare, sometimes even number. Flowering period from April to May, fruit period from August to September.

References 

macranthum
Articles with 'species' microformats